Abderrahman Sebti (born 9 January 1916, date of death unknown) was a Moroccan épée, foil and sabre fencer. He competed in five events at the 1960 Summer Olympics.

References

External links
 

1916 births
Year of death missing
Moroccan male épée fencers
Olympic fencers of Morocco
Fencers at the 1960 Summer Olympics
People from Fez, Morocco
Moroccan male foil fencers
Moroccan male sabre fencers